The steamer SS Ercolano was a passenger steamship which plied the waters of the Mediterranean in the 1850s.

The vessel was operated by the Neapolitan Line, operating from Naples to destinations such as Genoa, Marseille and Malta.

Sinking
{
  "type": "FeatureCollection",
  "features": [

   {
      "type": "Feature",
      "properties": {
          "title": "Approximate sinking location",
          "description": "The Ercolano reportedly went down off the coast between Antibes and Nice",
          "marker-symbol": "ferry",
          "marker-size": "large",
          "marker-color": "f00"
      },
      "geometry": {
        "type": "Point",
        "coordinates": [
          7.5243,
          43.4459
        ]
      }
    },

  ]
}
On April 24, 1854 the ship left Genoa at 2:00 PM on April 24, 1854 bound for Marseilles with eighty passengers. The steamship sank after a collision with Sicilia in the Gulf of Genoa, somewhere between Nice and Antibes. The passengers included two British politicians: Thomas Plumer Halsey MP, who was drowned along with his wife, youngest son, and two servants; and Sir Robert Peel MP, who survived by swimming ashore. In all, about thirty-six passengers and twelve crew members were lost. Two survivors were later plucked from the wreckage near Nice.

The Sicilia was a newly built steam yacht, on a transfer voyage from the shipyard to Italy when it struck the Ercolano. Its maiden voyage to the United States was cancelled and the vessel was sold to Messageries Impériales. On 9 September 1854, the Sicilia sank in the Tyrrhenian Sea.

The Household Narrative of Current Events of May 1854 reported:

A survivor of the sinking stated that the captains of neither vessel were on deck at the time of the collision and that the event was due to their negligence.

References

Citations

Sources
Robin and Terry Harris, eds. 'The Eldon House Diaries: Five Women's views of the 19th century' Toronto: Champlain Society, 1994
"Lecture by Sir Robert Peel.- Most Interesting Account of His Shipwreck" Nelson Examiner and New Zealand Chronicle March 31, 1855
"Foreign Intelligence" The Times April 28, 1854
"The Loss of the Ercolano" The Times May 2, 1854
"The Loss of the Ergolano -- M. Samson" The Times May 3, 1854

Steamships of Italy
Shipwrecks in the Mediterranean Sea
Passenger ships of Italy
Shipwrecks of Italy
Ships sunk in collisions
Maritime incidents in April 1854